The 2001 Open SEAT Godó, also known as the Torneo Godó,  was a men's tennis tournament played on outdoor clay courts at the Real Club de Tenis Barcelona in Barcelona, Spain and was part of the International Series Gold of the 2001 ATP Tour. The tournament ran from 23 April until 29 April 2001. Second-seeded Juan Carlos Ferrero won the singles title.

Finals

Singles

 Juan Carlos Ferrero defeated  Carlos Moyá 4–6, 7–5, 6–3, 3–6, 7–5
 It was Ferrero's 3rd singles title of the year and the 4th of his career.

Doubles

 Donald Johnson /  Jared Palmer defeated  Tommy Robredo /  Fernando Vicente 7–6(7–2), 6–4
 It was Johnson's 3rd title of the year and the 17th of his career. It was Palmer's 2nd title of the year and the 19th of his career.

Entrants

Seeds

 Rankings as of April 16, 2001.

References

External links
 Official website
 ATP tournament profile

 
2001
Open SEAT Godo